Events from the year 1849 in Russia

Incumbents
 Monarch – Nicholas I

Events

  Grand Kremlin Palace
  Krasnoye Sormovo Factory No. 112
  Nakhichevansky Uyezd
  Ordubadsky Uyezd
 Wissotzky Tea

Births

 February 22 – Nikolay Yakovlevich Sonin, mathematician (d. 1915)

Deaths

References

1849 in Russia
Years of the 19th century in the Russian Empire